Local elections were held in Garissa County were held on 4 March 2013. Under the new constitution, which was passed in a 2010 referendum, the 2013 general election was the first to elect County Governors and their Deputies for the 47 newly created counties. They were also first general elections run by the Independent Electoral and Boundaries Commission(IEBC), which has released the official list of candidates.

Gubernatorial election

Prospective candidates
The following are some of the candidates who made public their intentions to run: 
 Mohammed Maulid Shurie - former CEO of the Northern Water Service Board
 Nathif Adam - former Chief Executive Officer of First Community Bank
 Harun Yussuf - former Garissa High Secondary School
 Bunow Korane - former Permanent Secretary

References

 

2013 local elections in Kenya